Psammophory is a method by which certain plants armor themselves with sand on their body parts making chances less for them to be eaten by animals.  Over 200 species of plants hailing from 88 genera in 34 families have been identified as psammorphorous.

The term was first proposed in 1989 by scientists studying the habits of the beetle Georissus which actively covers its elytra with sand or mud particles.

References

Botany